The Murut are an indigenous ethnic group, comprising 29 sub-ethnic groups inhabiting the northern inland regions of Borneo. The Murutic languages are a family of half a dozen closely related Austronesian languages. The Murut can be found mainly in Sabah, including in Sarawak, Brunei, and Kalimantan, Indonesia.

Etymology 
The literal translation of murut is "hill people".

Demographics 

A large percentage of the Murut communities are in the southwest interior of Sabah, East Malaysia, specifically the districts of Keningau, Tenom, Nabawan, and Beaufort along the Sapulut and Padas rivers. They can also be found inhabiting the border areas of Sarawak, (especially around the Lawas and Limbang areas, where they are also referred to as Tagal people), North Kalimantan (traditionally concentrated in Malinau and Nunukan), and Brunei. 
 
The Murut population in Brunei is mainly found in the sparsely populated Temburong district, but are actually consisting of Southern Murut which is more accurately termed "Lun Bawang". They once supplied military might to the Sultans of Brunei. Their population has dwindled in recent years. They are defined as one of the seven indigenous groups that are considered to be Bumiputera in Brunei. The Murut in Brunei and Sarawak (Southern Murut) is ethnically and linguistically different from Murut in Sabah (Northern Murut). In Sarawak, the confusing term "Murut" is hence replaced with the term "Lun Bawang", while this has not take place in Brunei. The Northern Murut is more commonly termed "Tagol" or "Tagal" in Brunei and Sarawak.

The Murut are divided between lowland (Timugon) and highland (Tagol) subgroups. They speak the Murutic languages, a branch of the Austronesian family. The Tagol Murut language serves as their lingua franca.

Customs and religion

The Murut were the last of Sabah's ethnic groups to renounce headhunting. As with the Iban of Sarawak, collecting heads of enemies traditionally served a very important role in Murut spiritual beliefs. For example, a man could only get married after he presented at least one head to the family of the desired girl.

The Murut were shifting cultivators of hill padi and tapioca, supplementing their diet with blowpipe hunting and with some fishing. They live in communal longhouses, usually near rivers, using the rivers as their highways. Most have now converted to Christianity, with about a fifth of the population being Muslims. However, they still maintain their culture.

Traditional dress for men was a jacket made of tree bark (Artocarpus tamaran), a red loincloth, and a headdress decorated with Argus pheasant feathers. Women wore a black sleeveless blouse and sarong, which fell just below the knees. Like most of the other indigenous groups in Sabah, the Murut decorated their clothing with distinctive beadwork and also made belts out of old silver coins. Another belt made of reddish-brown glass beads plus yellow and blue beads was hung loosely around the waist.

Murut wedding or funeral feasts can last several days. Ancient Chinese jars hold a prominent status in Murut customs. Jars are also a place of spirits, and larger jars were formerly used as coffins.

Musical heritage

The Murut have a musical heritage consisting of various types of agung ensembles – ensembles composed of large hanging, suspended or held, bossed/knobbed gongs which act as a drone without any accompanying melodic instrument.

Murut also used bamboo as a musical instrument, by using bamboo to compose songs. Some musical instrument like tangkung (similar to that of a guitar, except it has only two strings) is made from wood. Tangkung is usually played during their leisure time.

Antanum

Antanum was a famous and influential Murut warrior from Sabah who according to local oral history claimed to have supernatural powers. Because of this, he was able to receive support from the chiefs and villagers from around Keningau, Tenom, Pensiangan, and Rundum and led the Rundum uprising against the British North Borneo Company but was killed during fighting with the company army in Sungai Selangit near Pensiangan.

Sub-ethnic groups

The Murut people are divided into three linguistic groups, namely:-
 Murutic languages cluster:
 Okolod (North Kalimantan, Indonesia)
 Keningau Murut (Keningau, Sabah, Malaysia)
 Tagal or Tahol Murut (Sabah, Malaysia) 
 Paluan (Sabah, Malaysia)
 Selungai Murut (North Kalimantan, Indonesia)
 Timugon Murut (Sabah, Malaysia) 
 Binta Murut (Sabah, Malaysia)
 Bulusu Murut (Kalimantan, Indonesia)
 Tingalan Murut (Kalimantan, Indonesia)
 Agabag Murut (Kalimantan, Indonesia)
 Northern languages cluster:
 Bookan (Sabah, Malaysia)
 Tidong languages cluster:
 Tidung people (Tarakan, North Kalimantan, Indonesia)
 Bulungan people (Bulungan Regency, North Kalimantan, Indonesia)
 Kalabakan (Sabah, Malaysia)
 Sembakung Murut (Sabah, Malaysia)
 Serudung Murut (Sabah, Malaysia)

Notable figures
Antanum – Murut warrior who fought against the British North Borneo Company but was killed while fighting with the company army in Sungai Selangit near Pensiangan
Gaunon Lulus – Murut man who built a railroad from Tanjung Aru to Melalap, Tenom, with Arthur Joseph West
Andre Anura – Malaysian athlete from Tenom, Sabah
Rubin Balang - former Sabah Minister.
Noorita Sual – Malaysian Parliament member
Raime Unggi – former member of the Malaysian Parliament
Tun Ahmad Koroh – fifth head of state of Sabah, also of partial Dusun ancestry
Tun Mohamad Adnan Robert – sixth head of state of Sabah
Tan Sri Suffian Koroh – former deputy chief minister of Sabah
John Daukom – Olympic sprinter

References 

 
Ethnic groups in Indonesia
Ethnic groups in Sabah
Dayak people
Headhunting